Eremocossus vaulogeri is a species of moth of the family Cossidae. It is found in Senegal, Mauritania, Morocco, Algeria, Libya, Tunisia, Egypt, Jordan, Israel, Syria, Egypt, Oman, Yemen, the United Arab Emirates, Saudi Arabia, Iraq and southern Iran.

Adults have been recorded on wing in April and December in Israel.

Subspecies
Eremocossus vaulogeri vaulogeri (Egypt, Algeria, Libya, Tunisia)
Eremocossus vaulogeri blanca (Daniel, 1949) (Iran: Baloutchistan)
Eremocossus vaulogeri erebuni Yakovlev, 2008 (Armenia)
Eremocossus vaulogeri jordana (Staudinger, 1897) (Israel, Jordan, Syria, Egypt, Oman, Saudi Arabia, United Arab Emirates, Yemen)
Eremocossus vaulogeri meirleirei (Rungs, 1951) (Morocco)
Eremocossus vaulogeri senegalensis Le Cerf, 1919 (Mauritania, Senegal)

References

Moths described in 1897
Cossinae
Insects of West Africa
Moths of Africa
Moths of the Middle East